Michel Lanskoy is a former male French international table tennis player.

He won a bronze medal at the 1947 World Table Tennis Championships in the Swaythling Cup (men's team event). He won two more bronze medals at the 1950 World Table Tennis Championships and the 1953 World Table Tennis Championships in the Swaythling Cup.

He was a five times French National doubles champion in 1950, 1951, 1953, 1956 and 1958.

See also
 List of table tennis players
 List of World Table Tennis Championships medalists

References

French male table tennis players
World Table Tennis Championships medalists
20th-century French people